Upper Thames was a United Kingdom European Parliament constituency, electing one member under the first-past-the-post system. It came into being for the European Parliament election of 1979 and ceased to exist in 1984, due to boundary reorganization.

Upper Thames consisted of the Westminster Parliament constituencies (on their 1974 boundaries) of Abingdon, Devizes, Henley, Newbury, Swindon, Reading North, and Reading South. Its only Member of the European Parliament was Robert Jackson.

Members of the European Parliament

Election results

References

External links
 David Boothroyd's United Kingdom Election Results

European Parliament constituencies in England (1979–1999)
Politics of Berkshire
Politics of Oxfordshire
1979 establishments in England
1984 disestablishments in England
Constituencies established in 1979
Constituencies disestablished in 1984